Ahmed Moustafa al-Husseiny was a Lebanese politician who served as minister and deputy multiple times.

He was born in Mazraat es-Siyad in Jbeil. He replaced Ibrahim Haidar as a Senator in 1926. He joined the National Bloc led by Émile Eddé, and represented them in different cabinets.

References 

Lebanese Shia Muslims
People from Byblos District
National Bloc (Lebanon) politicians
Government ministers of Lebanon